Richard Harding (born c. 1956) is a Scottish curler. Harding is currently the Head of Broadcast for the World Curling Federation (WCF) and was the  Equipment and Logistics Officer for the WCF.

At the time of the 1987 World Championship, he worked as a leisure manager, which among other things involved making curling ice at his Forest Hills Curling Club. He also worked as a curling reporter for the Glasgow Herald, Dundee Courier, the Aberdeen Press and Journal and for the BBC.

Teams

References

External links
 

Living people
Scottish male curlers
Scottish curling champions
1950s births
Curling ice makers
Scottish sportswriters